Clamtones was an American folk rock group, and Jeffrey Frederick's most notable band. Most of the band's lineup also performed with The Holy Modal Rounders at one point.

Biography 
Although songwriter and musician, Jeffrey Frederick, organized his first Clamtones band in Vermont during the early 1970s, the best-known incarnation of the band was based out of Portland, Oregon.  The Clamtones usually comprised Frederick (vocals and guitar); Jill Gross (vocals); Robin Remaily (mandolin, fiddle, guitar, other strings); Richard Tyler (piano); Dave Reisch (bass); Teddy Deane (woodwinds and horns); and Roger North (drums).  As the Clamtones, Gross, Reisch and Remaily joined Frederick, Peter Stampfel, Michael Hurley and friends on the 1976 Have Moicy! (Rounder Records).  However, the definitive studio recording of the full band was the following year's Spiders In The Moonlight. Some of the tracks from that album and from Have Moicy! were included in the 2003 Rounder compilation album, I Make A Wish For A Potato.  In 2007, the original album was digitally remastered, and three studio tracks from the later Jeffrey Frederick Band were added, and the work republished on CD as Resurrection of Spiders In The Moonlight.

Jeffrey Frederick & The Clamtones B.C. (Frederick Productions, 2005) was a remastered effort taken from a 1976 radio broadcast of their show at Rohan's Roadhouse in Vancouver, British Columbia, Canada.

The Clamtones were part of an unusual arrangement in which the same band members played by that name when Frederick took the stage, but as the Holy Modal Rounders when Steve Weber fronted the band, typically as alternative sets in the same show. Weber's portion of the above-referenced Vancouver performance has been released as Steve Weber, The Holy Modal Rounders, B.C. (Frederick Productions, 2005). Clamtones, without Frederick and Gross, also performed on the Holy Modal Rounder's Adelphi recording, Last Round.

Although Frederick and Tyler are deceased, the rest of the Clamtones continue to be musically active.  When he is not touring with Michael Hurley, backing the Holy Modal Rounders or on some other project, Reisch sings and plays bass with the Freak Mountain Ramblers, along with North on percussion.  Remaily also plays with them on occasion, at Holy Modal Rounders reunions, as well as with a number of musical collectivities on the Oregon Coast.  Deane had an active theatrical and musical career in Portland, most notably leading the Swingline Cubs, a seven piece swing band. He continued to play and sing, currently as part of the duo, the Play-Rite Boys.  In 2008, he recorded a new album of original songs, So Far So Good, with the remaining Clamtones and others. Gross performs from time to time in the Boston, Massachusetts area, and appeared on Michael Hurley's album, Sweetkorn, as well as on the tribute album, St. Jeffrey's Day: The Songs Of Jeffrey Frederick, Volume One (2008).

Jeffrey Frederick and the Clamtones were inducted into the Oregon Music Hall of Fame on October 8, 2011

Discography
 Jeffrey Frederick and the Clamtones, Spiders In The Moonlight (Rounder, 1977). An expanded version is available on CD, billed as Resurrection of Spiders In The Moonlight (Frederick Productions, 2007)
 Jeffrey Frederick and the Clamtones, Clamtones B.C. (Frederick Productions, 2005)

References

Psychedelic folk groups
Musical groups from Portland, Oregon
American folk rock groups